Diaminohexanoic acid may refer to:

 2,6-Diaminohexanoic acid (lysine)
 3,6-Diaminohexanoic acid (beta-lysine)